A harmonic spectrum is a spectrum containing only frequency components whose frequencies are whole number multiples of the fundamental frequency; such frequencies are known as harmonics. "The individual partials are not heard separately but are blended together by the ear into a single tone."

In other words, if  is the fundamental frequency, then a harmonic spectrum has the form 

A standard result of Fourier analysis is that a function has a harmonic spectrum if and only if it is periodic.

See also
 Fourier series
 Harmonic series (music)
 Periodic function
 Scale of harmonics
 Undertone series

References

Functional analysis
Acoustics
Sound